Proof is an American supernatural drama television series that aired on TNT from June 16 through August 18, 2015. The series starred Jennifer Beals, Matthew Modine, and Joe Morton. It was produced by TNT, with Kyra Sedgwick, series creator Rob Bragin, Tom Jacobson, Jill Littman, and Alex Graves serving as executive producers. On September 24, 2015, TNT canceled the series of Proof after one season.

Plot
Following the death of her teenage son, a legal separation from her husband, and a rift with her daughter, Dr. Carolyn Tyler is persuaded by Ivan Turing, a tech inventor and billionaire with cancer, to investigate supernatural cases of reincarnation, near-death experiences, and hauntings, in hopes of finding evidence that death is not final.

Cast
 Jennifer Beals as Dr. Carolyn "Cat" Tyler: a cardiac surgeon at Bay Vista Hospital in Seattle
 Matthew Modine as Ivan Turing: an inventor billionaire stricken with cancer
 David Sutcliffe as Dr. Leonard "Len" Barliss: Carolyn's ex-husband and a pediatric surgeon at Bay Vista
 Edi Gathegi as Dr. Zedan Badawi: a Kenyan intern at Bay Vista who assists Carolyn
 Joe Morton as Dr. Charles Richmond: a hospital administrator at Bay Vista
 Caroline Rose Kaplan as Janel Ramsey: Ivan's assistant
 Callum Blue as Peter Van Owen: a best-selling author who claims to be psychic
 Annie Thurman as Sophie Barliss: Carolyn and Len's teenage daughter

Reception
Proof received mixed reviews. Review aggregator site Metacritic gave the first season a "mixed or average" score of 59 out of 100, based on 11 critics' ratings. On another review aggregator site, Rotten Tomatoes, it held a 57% rating, based on 14 reviews, with an average score of 7.1/10. The Rotten Tomatoes consensus reads: "Proof'''s intriguing premise – and Jennifer Beals' strong starring performance – can't compensate for a lack of compelling stories."

Brian Lowry of Variety said the show is exploring the mysteries of the afterlife in uninspiring and banal ways. Keith Uhlich writing for The Hollywood Reporter'' said that on paper, the show "sounds like disaster," but it is revealed to be "a beguiling object."

Episodes

References

External links
 
 

2010s American drama television series
2010s American supernatural television series
2015 American television series debuts
2010s American medical television series
2015 American television series endings
English-language television shows
TNT (American TV network) original programming